"Colorful" (stylized as "colorful") is the 13th single by 9nine, a Japanese idol girl group. It was released on February 6, 2013 on SME Records.

Track listing

Charts

References

9nine songs
2013 in Japanese music
2013 singles
SME Records singles
Song articles with missing songwriters